The 1997 Gold Coast Classic doubles was a tennis competition as part of the  1997 Gold Coast Classic, a tennis tournament played on outdoor hard courts at the Hope Island Resort Tennis Centre in Hope Island, Queensland in Australia that was part of Tier III of the 1997 WTA Tour. The tournament was held from 30 December 1996 through 5 January 1997.

Naoko Kijimuta and Nana Miyagi won in the final 7–6, 6–1 against Ruxandra Dragomir and Silvia Farina.

Seeds
Champion seeds are indicated in bold text while text in italics indicates the round in which those seeds were eliminated.

 Patricia Tarabini /  Caroline Vis (semifinals)
 Els Callens /  Helena Suková (first round)
 Naoko Kijimuta /  Nana Miyagi (champions)
 Sabine Appelmans /  Barbara Rittner (first round)

Draw

External links
 1997 Gold Coast Classic Doubles Draw

1997 Gold Coast Classic
1997 WTA Tour